Ictalurivirus is a genus of viruses in the order Herpesvirales, in the family Alloherpesviridae. Fish serve as natural hosts. There are three species in this genus. Diseases associated with this genus include: channel catfish disease.

Species 
The genus consists of the following three species:

 Acipenserid herpesvirus 2
 Ictalurid herpesvirus 1
 Ictalurid herpesvirus 2

Structure 
Viruses in Ictalurivirus are enveloped, with icosahedral and spherical to pleomorphic geometries, and T=16 symmetry. The diameter is around 150-200 nm. Genomes are linear and non-segmented, around 134kb in length.

Life cycle 
Viral replication is nuclear, and is lysogenic. Entry into the host cell is achieved by attachment of the viral glycoproteins to host receptors, which mediates endocytosis. DNA templated transcription is the method of transcription. Fish serve as the natural host. Transmission routes are passive diffusion.

References

External links 

 Viralzone: Ictalurivirus
 ICTV

Alloherpesviridae
Virus genera